Polyadic algebras (more recently called Halmos algebras) are algebraic structures introduced by Paul Halmos. They are related to first-order logic analogous to the relationship between Boolean algebras and propositional logic (see Lindenbaum–Tarski algebra).

There are other ways to relate first-order logic to algebra, including Tarski's cylindric algebras (when equality is part of the logic) and Lawvere's functorial semantics (a categorical approach).

References

Further reading
Paul Halmos, Algebraic Logic, Chelsea Publishing, New York (1962)

Algebraic logic